Marty Brill may refer to:

 Marty Brill (American football) (1906–1973), American football coach
 Marty Brill (comedian) (1932–2021), American comedian